Przemysław Andrejuk (born 9 February 1977 in Kodeń) is a Polish politician. He was elected to the Sejm on 25 September 2005 with 7,000 votes in 7 Chełm district, as a candidate for the League of Polish Families list.

See also
List of Sejm members (2005–2007)

References

1977 births
Living people
People from Biała Podlaska County
Members of the Polish Sejm 2005–2007
League of Polish Families politicians